2go is a free mobile social networking and online dating service with in-app purchases, provided by 2go Interactive (Pty) Ltd currently based in Cape Town, South Africa.

Device support published by 2go in June 2013 accounted for approximately 1,500 different devices, among which were feature phones and smartphones, namely: Android, Blackberry OS and Blackberry 10. The number of registered users reported by 2go in 2014, was approximately 21 million across Africa, 12,5 million of whom were based in Nigeria. 2go Interactive has not issued recent publications of the current amount of registered users or monthly active users per region.

History 

While currently based in Cape Town, South Africa, 2go was created in Johannesburg, South Africa, by a group of University of Witwatersrand computer science students, in 2007. Originally developed as a mobile website and a students-only model, it was intended to function as a communication tool among students for the uploading and sharing of the students' timetable, lectures, and rendezvous with each other.

In 2008, two of  the founders left, leaving Alan Wolff and Ashley Peter behind. Under their management, 2go moved away from the students-only model by targeting developing markets in Africa. 2go continued to grow, despite a lack of external investment, due to its focus on feature phones, which most African mobile markets consisted out of. Over 7 billion messages are sent across the service each month, most of which within paid-for chat rooms using the platform's currency, GoCredits. In June 2013, 2go for Android was released on the Google Play Store and in December 2014 had reached over 2 million monthly active users on Android. The Android version influenced many design changes and additions which other platforms received in the v3.5 release. 2go for BlackBerry 10 was released in April 2014. The latest release was version 3.8.

2go has since declined in its popularity and has lost most of its users. Much of 2go's rise was as a result of the Java platform which was very popular in Africa and as these phones became less popular, it also began to lose its spark.

The major reason why 2go failed was because they could not innovate fast enough to survive on Android which came all of a sudden.

2Go simply could not innovate truly adding any new feature or even optimizing it well for Android. They merely ported its code base onto Android without developing anything new on that platform.

Features 

2go is a full featured feature phone instant messaging application. Supported devices require Java and internet connectivity via CSD, GPRS, 3G or WiFi to operate.
Originally intended as a feature phone exclusive application, versions for Android, BlackBerry OS and BlackBerry 10 powered smartphones have also been released. 2go offers one-on-one and group chat services in addition to paid-for chat room facilities which makes use of the platform's GoCredits currency, which is also spent on games and other content.

2go Fastlane – 2go added a new feature to the messenger called 2go 6.2.0 fastlane. From this fastlane, you get quick access to live Sports Updates, up to date news from Supersports and News24.

Supported platforms 

2go is available on a variety of mobile and computing platforms, each independently developed for the platform.
These are:
 Android
 BlackBerry OS
 BlackBerry 10
 Java ME

References

External links 

 

Instant messaging clients
Mobile instant messaging clients
Android (operating system) software
BlackBerry software